The National Innovation Council (NIC) is the Philippine government's highest policy-making body for national innovation development. It was established to develop the country's innovation goals, priorities, and long-term national strategy established by virtue of Republic Act No. 11293 or the Philippine Innovation Act of 2018. It is headed by the president of the Philippines as chairman of the NIC, with the Secretary of Socioeconomic Planning as vice-chairman.

The NIC is operationalized by an Executive Director who also leads the National Innovation Council Secretariat which is housed under the National Economic and Development Authority. It provides strategic foresight, funding, capacity building, and policy coordination initiatives for a smarter and more innovative Philippines. 

The primary functions of the NIC are in the formulation and development of the National Innovation Agenda and Strategy Document (NIASD), the management of the Innovation Fund, the oversight over Innovation Credit and Financing programs through the Bangko Sentral ng Pilipinas, and in monitoring the Global Innovation Index (GII) ranking of the country.

As defined by the law, "innovation" refers to the creation of new ideas that results in the development of new or improved policies, products, processes, or services which are then spread or transferred across the market.

Composition of the Council 
The NIC is chaired by the President of the Philippines, vice-chaired by the Secretary for Socio-economic Planning (National Economic and Development Authority), and composed of the heads following member-agencies and representative executive members:

National Innovation Agenda and Strategy Document (NIASD) 
The National Innovation Agenda and Strategy Document (NIASD) is the Philippine government's 10-year foresight and innovation plan which establishes the country's vision and long-term goals for innovation consistent with the country's long-term vision, and with global and regional commitments. The document is mandated to have "innovation priority areas" and a roadmap consisting of strategies to improve innovation governance across government agencies through the following:

 coordination of innovation policies, programs and projects across agencies and LGUs;
 deepening and accelerating innovation efforts, including inclusive innovation programs that target the poorest of the poor; 
 integrating and fostering public-private partnerships, including those with large businesses, MSMEs, academe, and RD&E institutions; 
 recommend measures to enable and empower public and private higher education institutions (HEIs) as knowledge producers and technology generators; and 
 the creation, protection, and commercialization of intellectual properties.

References

External links 

 About NEDA

Innovation organizations
Government agencies of the Philippines
2018 establishments in the Philippines